Behrestan (also Romanized as Behrestān and Baharestan; also known as Bahristān and Behristān) is a village in Asir Rural District, Asir District, Mohr County, Fars Province, Iran. At the 2006 census, its population was 493, in 93 families.

References 

Populated places in Mohr County